Kyle Owen McGinn (born 23 May 1988) is an Australian politician. He was elected to the Western Australian Legislative Council at the 2017 state election, as a Labor member in Mining and Pastoral Region. His term began on 22 May 2017.

McGinn worked as a union representative before entering state politics.

References

1988 births
Living people
Australian Labor Party members of the Parliament of Western Australia
Members of the Western Australian Legislative Council
21st-century Australian politicians